Howard Andrew Lindsay (born August 14, 1963, in Jamaica) is an Antiguan and Barbudan Runner.  He competed as a 4 x 400 metres runner at the 1984, 1988 and 1996 Olympic Games. He also competed in the 4 x 100 metres relay and 200 metres at the 1988 Olympics. His personal best is 45.7 seconds for the 400 metres.  He currently coaches middle school athletes at United Nations International School (UNIS) in Manhattan, New York, and he runs in masters competitions  such as the World Masters Athletics Championships.

References 

1965 births
Living people
Antigua and Barbuda male sprinters
Antigua and Barbuda male middle-distance runners
Athletes (track and field) at the 1984 Summer Olympics
Athletes (track and field) at the 1988 Summer Olympics
Athletes (track and field) at the 1996 Summer Olympics
Athletes (track and field) at the 1987 Pan American Games
Olympic athletes of Antigua and Barbuda
Pan American Games competitors for Antigua and Barbuda
Jamaican emigrants to Antigua and Barbuda